"The Master of the Mississippi" is a 1992 Scrooge McDuck comic by Don Rosa. It's the second of the original 12 chapters in the series The Life and Times of Scrooge McDuck. The story takes place from 1880 to 1882. 

The story was first published in the Danish Anders And & Co. #1992-33; the first American publication was in Uncle Scrooge #286, in June 1994.

Plot
In 1880, young Scrooge McDuck has travelled to America to seek his fortune.  Making his way to New Orleans, he looks up his Uncle Angus "Pothole" McDuck, and helps him as a deckhand on his steamboat alongside the inventor and engineer Ratchet Gearloose, racing to be first to a site along the Mississippi river to salvage a shipment of gold from a ship that sank 30 years earlier while transporting it for the government. The Beagle Boys are also in pursuit of the gold and comes to fight Scrooge and Pothole about it.

After being caught by the Beagle Boys, Scrooge tricks them, and their riverboat is destroyed. In the end, no one gets the gold, as the government takes it back. Scrooge then takes full employment on Pothole's boat, and after a few years when Pothole retires, Scrooge buys it for himself. However, this just as the steam powered locomotives are gaining popularity as a mean of transportation and railroad is being laid across the nation, making riverboats somewhat obsolete.

During one later boat ride, Scrooge transports more government gold, when he comes across a lady giving away free firewood - a deal that Scrooge simply cannot resist. However, the lady turns out to be a Beagle Boy in disguise. The Beagle Boys takes the gold and locks Scrooge and Ratchet in the boiler room, after having loaded and locked shut one of the boilers full of pine knots and pitch - to make the boiler pressure overload and explode the boiler due to pressure. Scrooge and Ratchet seeks protection in the other boiler among loads of stuffed cotton.

In the meantime, the boat, only running on one boiler, makes a turn on the water and runs ashore, violently following the Beagle Boys across land. Upon reaching their hideout, the boiler - and with it, the boat - explodes. Scrooge and Ratchet, having hidden in the other boiler, are all right, while the Beagle Boys are taken to jail.

Since he no longer has a riverboat, Scrooge decides to move west, along the railroad and so he takes a job as a fireman on the Wabash Cannonball.

External links

King of the Klondike on Duckman
The Life and Times of $crooge McDuck - Episode 8

Fiction set in 1880
Fiction set in 1881
Fiction set in 1882
1992 in comics
Donald Duck comics by Don Rosa
Comics set in the 19th century
Comics set in the United States
Disney comics stories
The Life and Times of Scrooge McDuck